The 1993 Ugandan Super League was the 26th season of the official Ugandan football championship, the top-level football league of Uganda.

Overview
The 1993 Uganda Super League was contested by 15 teams and was won by Express FC, while Wandegeya FC, Busia and Uganda Airlines were relegated.

League standings

Leading goalscorer
The top goalscorer in the 1993 season was Mathias Kaweesa of SC Villa with 20 goals.

Footnotes

External links
 Uganda - List of Champions - RSSSF (Hans Schöggl)
 Ugandan Football League Tables - League321.com

Ugandan Super League seasons
1
Uganda
Uganda